The Administrative-Territorial Units of the Left Bank of the Dniester (Transnistria) is a formal administrative unit of Moldova established by the Government of Moldova to delineate the territory controlled by the unrecognized Pridnestrovian Moldavian Republic (commonly known as Transnistria).

History
After the dissolution of the Soviet Union in 1991, the Transnistria War broke out between the Republic of Moldova and the unrecognized state Pridnestrovian Moldavian Republic over territories of the former Moldavian Soviet Socialist Republic. Since the end of the war there has been territory claimed by Moldova, but controlled by the Pridnestrovian Moldavian Republic. There is also territory claimed by the Pridnestrovian Moldavian Republic, which is controlled by Moldova.

On 22 July 2005, the autonomous territorial unit with special legal status was established in Moldovan law. This was done as part of the Yushchenko Plan for reintegrating Transnistria into Moldova.

Territory
The territory of the Administrative-Territorial Units of the Left Bank of the Dniester mostly coincides with territory of the Pridnestrovian Moldavian Republic (Transnistria), but there are two important differences:
 Bender (Tighina) is included in the unrecognized Pridnestrovian Moldavian Republic (commonly known as Transnistria), but it is excluded from the Administrative-Territorial Units of the Left Bank of the Dniester and is part of the historical region of Bessarabia.
 Territories which are claimed by Pridnestrovian Moldavian Republic but controlled by Moldova are excluded from the autonomous territorial unit. These territories include parts of the Dubăsari District, Căușeni District, and Anenii Noi District.

Settlements
There are 147 settlements in Transnistria (settlements on the east bank of the Dniester river): one municipality, nine towns, two settlements which are parts of towns, 69 villages (communes), and 135 settlements which are parts of villages (communes).

Administration
The law which establishes the Administrative-Territorial Units of the Left Bank of the Dniester states that the region is to elect a Supreme Council on the basis of free, transparent and democratic elections. The Supreme Council should then adopt a Basic Law to formally establish the executive institutions of the region. The region has the right to adopt its own symbols to be used in conjunction with the national symbols of Moldova. The official languages of the region are Romanian in the Latin script, Russian and Ukrainian. The region would be able to establish relationships with other countries for economic, technical, scientific and humanitarian purposes.

Notes

References

External links
  Law No. 173 from 22.07.2005 "About main notes about special legal status of settlements of left bank of Dnestr (Transnistria)"
  Law No. 173 from 22.07.2005 "About main notes about special legal status of settlements of left bank of Dnestr (Transnistria)"

Autonomous governments in exile
Territorial units of Moldova
States and territories established in 2005